Garfield David Owen (20 Mar 1932 – 17 Jan 2019) was a Welsh teacher, and dual-code international rugby union, and professional rugby league footballer who played in the 1950s and 1960s. He first played amateur rugby for Llanharan RFC, Maesteg RFC, Wrexham RFC and Newport RFC at club level before winning six caps for Wales.

International honours
Garfield Owen represented Rugby League XIII while at Halifax in 1958, and represented Wales while at Halifax in 1959.

Honoured at Halifax
Garfield Owen is a Halifax Hall Of Fame Inductee.

Career records
Garfield Owen is one of fewer than twenty-five Welshmen to have scored more than 1000 points in their rugby league career.

Personal life
Garfield Owen married Marlene (née Sternson) in 1957 in Surrey. They had two children; Russell H. Owen and Sally L. Owen.

His death was announced on 17 January 2019, he was 86-years-old.

References

External links
(archived by web.archive.org) Profile at blackandambers.co.uk
The Welshman who kicked an amazing 535 goals for Halifax

1932 births
2019 deaths
Barbarian F.C. players
Dual-code rugby internationals
Halifax R.L.F.C. players
Keighley Cougars players
Llanharan RFC players
Maesteg RFC players
Newport RFC players
People from Glamorgan
Rugby league fullbacks
Rugby league players from Rhondda Cynon Taf
Rugby League XIII players
Rugby union fullbacks
Rugby union players from Llanharan
Wales international rugby union players
Wales national rugby league team players
Welsh rugby league players
Welsh rugby union players